The 1995 Canisius Golden Griffins football team represented Canisius College in the 1995 NCAA Division I-AA football season. The Golden Griffins offense scored 130 points while the defense allowed 176 points.

Schedule

References

Canisius
Canisius Golden Griffins football seasons
Canisius Golden Griffins football